Benjamin, Benny, Bennie, or Ben Wilson may refer to:

Arts and entertainment 
 Benjamin Wilson (painter) (1721–1788), English painter and scientist
 Ben F. Wilson (1876–1930), American actor, director, screenwriter and producer
 Ben Wilson (American artist) (1913–2001), American Abstract Expressionist
 Ben Wilson (English artist) (born 1963), English wood carver and outsider artist
 Ben Wilson (musician) (born 1967), American musician and keyboardist for the band Blues Traveler

Politics 
 Benjamin Davis Wilson (a.k.a. Don Benito Wilson, 1811–1878), American landowner and politician in California
 Benjamin Wilson (congressman) (1825–1901), American politician, U.S. Representative from West Virginia
 Benjamin Franklin Wilson (politician) (1851–1937), American politician from Oklahoma
 Benjamin H. Wilson (1925–1988), American politician in the Pennsylvania House of Representatives
 Ben Wilson, 4th Baron Nunburnholme (1928–1998), British peer

Sports

Cricket
 Benjamin Wilson (New Zealand cricketer) (1870-1929), New Zealand cricketer
 Benny Wilson (1879–1957), English cricketer
 Ben Wilson (English cricketer) (1921–1993), English cricketer

Other sports
 Bennie Wilson (1891–death unknown), American Negro leagues baseball player
 Ben Wilson (American football coach) (1926–1970), American football coach
 Ben Wilson (fullback) (born 1939), American football player
 Behn Wilson (born 1958), Canadian ice hockey player
 Ben Wilson (basketball) (1967–1984), American basketball player
 Benjamin Wilson (referee) (born 1975), Australian football referee
 Ben Wilson (kitesurfer) (born 1977), Australian kitesurfer
 Ben Wilson (Australian footballer) (born 1977), Australian rules footballer
 Ben Wilson (motorcyclist) (born 1982), English superbike rider
 Ben Wilson (speedway rider) (born 1986), English speedway rider
 Ben Wilson (footballer, born 1992) (born 1992), English footballer

Others 
 Benjamin Wilson (biblical scholar) (1817–1900), English biblical scholar, co-founder of the Church of God of the Abrahamic Faith
 Benjamin F. Wilson (1922–1988), American soldier and Medal of Honor recipient